Bartholomew O'Shaughnessey, Chief of the Name, born 1789, alive 1843.

O'Shaughnessy was a barber living in Galway in the 1840s who was the apparent Chief of the Name to the O'Shaughnessey family. He married and had family, as did his younger brother, Andrew (born 1796). The succession of the senior line after this time is unknown.

References

 D'Alton, John, Illustrations, Historical and Genealogical, of King James's Irish Army List (1689). Dublin: 1st edition (single volume), 1855. pp. 328–32.
 History of Galway, James Hardiman, 1820
 Tabular pedigrees of O'Shaughnessy of Gort (1543–1783), Martin J. Blake, Journal of the Galway Archaeological and Historical Society, vi (1909–10), p. 64; vii (1911–12), p. 53.
 John O'Donovan. The Genealogies, Tribes, and Customs of Hy-Fiachrach. Dublin: Irish Archaeological Society. 1844. Pedigree of O'Shaughnessy: pp. 372–91.
 Old Galway, Professor Mary Donovan O'Sullivan, 1942
 Galway: Town and Gown, edited Moran et al., 1984
 Galway: History and Society, 1996

People from County Galway
19th-century Irish people
Bartholomew